Il-Gelmus is a hill located in Victoria, Gozo, Malta, 1 kilometre away from Victoria's city centre. The estimated terrain elevation above sea level is 133 metres. The width at the base is 0.56 kilometres. In the area around Il-Gelmus are peninsulas, rock formations, beaches and caves. 

The coordinates of Il-Gelmus are  36°02'55"N 14°13'58.01"E. 

This hill has the maximum thickness of greensand layer in the Maltese archipelago. The greensand layer in Gelmus reaches a maximum of 11 metres. 

This area is related to the legend of the Golden Calf of Gozo, and is also mentioned in the Maltese poem "L-Għoġol tad-Deheb" by F. X. Mangion that also refers to this same legend.

Climate 
The climate of the area is temperate.
Average annual temperature in the neighborhood is 18°C. The warmest month is July when the average temperature is 26°C and the coldest is in January, with 12°C. The average annual rainfall is 581 millimetres. The rainiest month is November, with an average of 157mm of precipitation, and the driest is July, with 1mm of rainfall.

See also
 Geography of Malta

References

Victoria, Gozo
Hills of Malta